Jovan Karamata (February 1, 1902 – August 14, 1967) was a Serbian mathematician. He is remembered for contributions to analysis, in particular, the Tauberian theory and the theory of slowly varying functions. Considered to be among the most influential Serbian mathematicians of the 20th century, Karamata was one of the founders of the Mathematical Institute of the Serbian Academy of Sciences and Arts, established in 1946.

Life 
Jovan Karamata was born in Zagreb on February 1, 1902 into a family descended from merchants based in the city of Zemun, which was then in Austria-Hungary, and now in Serbia. Being of Aromanian origin, the family traced its roots back to Pyrgoi, Eordaia, West Macedonia (his father Ioannis Karamatas was the president of the "Greek Community of Zemun"). Its business affairs on the borders of the Austro-Hungarian and Ottoman empires were very well known. In 1914, he finished most of his primary school in Zemun but because of constant warfare on the borderlands, Karamata's father sent him, together with his brothers and his sister, to Switzerland for their own safety. In Lausanne, 1920, he finished primary school oriented towards mathematics and sciences. In the same year he enrolled at the Engineering faculty of Belgrade University and, after several years moved to the Philosophy and Mathematicians sector, where he graduated in 1925.

He spent the years 1927–1928 in Paris, as a fellow of the Rockefeller Foundation, and in 1928 he became Assistant for Mathematics at the Faculty of Philosophy of Belgrade University. In 1930 he became Assistant Professor, in 1937 Associate Professor and, after the end of World War II, in 1950 he became Full Professor. In 1951 he was elected Full Professor at the University of Geneva. In 1933 he became a member of Yugoslav Academy of Sciences and Arts, Czech Royal Society in 1936, and Serbian Royal Academy in 1939 as well as a fellow of Serbian Academy of Sciences in 1948. He was one of the founders of the Mathematical Institute of the Serbian Academy of Sciences and Arts in 1946.

Karamata was member of the Swiss, French and German mathematical societies, the French Association for the Development of Science, and the primary editor of the journal L’Enseignement Mathématique in Geneva. He also taught at the University of Novi Sad.

In 1931 he married Emilija Nikolajevic, who gave birth to their two sons and a daughter. His wife died in 1959. After a long illness, Karamata died on August 14, 1967 in Geneva. His ashes rest in his native town of Zemun.

Legacy 
Karamata published 122 scientific papers, 15 monographs and text-books as well as 7 professional-pedagogical papers.

Karamata is best known for his work on mathematical analysis. He introduced the notion of regularly varying function, and discovered a new class of theorems of Tauberian type, today known as Karamata's tauberian theorems. He also worked on Mercer's theorems, Frullani integral, and other topics in analysis. In 1935 he introduced the brackets and braces notation for Stirling numbers (analogous to the binomial coefficients notation), which is now known as Karamata notation.  He is also cited for Karamata's inequality.

In Serbia, Karamata founded the "Karamata's (Yugoslav) school of mathematics”. Today, Karamata is the most frequently cited Serbian mathematician. He is the developer and co-developer of dozens of mathematical theorems and has had  a lasting influence in 20th-century mathematics.

See also
 Mihailo Petrović Alas
 Bogdan Gavrilović

References

Further reading 
N.H. Bingham, C.M. Goldie, J.L. Teugels, Regular Variation, Encyclopedia of Mathematics and its Applications, vol. 27, Cambridge Univ. Press, 1987.
J.L. Geluk, L. de Haan, Regular Variation Extensions and Tauberian Theorems, CWI Tract 40, Amsterdam, 1987.
Maric V, Radasin Z, Regularly Varying Functions in Asymptotic Analysis
Nikolic A, About two famous results of Jovan Karamata, Archives Internationales d’Histoire des Sciences
Nikolic A, Jovan Karamata (1902–1967), Lives and work of the Serbian scientists, SANU, Biographies and bibliographies, Book 5
Tomic M, Academician Jovan Karamata, on occasion of his death, SANU, Vol CDXXIII, t. 37, Belgrade, 1968 (in Serbian)
Tomic M, Jovan Karamata (1902–1967), L’Enseignement Mathématique
Tomic M, Aljancic S, Remembering Karamata, Publications de l’Institut Mathématique

External links 

Tổng quát về Bất đẳng thức Karamata (tiếng Việt)

1902 births
1967 deaths
Scientists from Zagreb
Serbs of Croatia
Serbian mathematicians
University of Belgrade Faculty of Philosophy alumni
Academic staff of the University of Geneva
Mathematical analysts
Yugoslav mathematicians
Serbian people of Aromanian descent